The men's shot put at the 2016 European Athletics Championships took place at the Olympic Stadium on 9 and 10 July.

Records

Schedule

+

Results

Qualification
Qualification: 20.30 m (Q) or best 12 performers (q)

Final

References

External links
 amsterdam2016.org, official championship site

Shot Put M
Shot put at the European Athletics Championships